The Massachusetts Correctional Institution at Lancaster (MCI-Lancaster) was a minimum security prison for men located in Lancaster, Massachusetts in the United States on the site of the former Lancaster Industrial School for Girls. When operational, the prison was under the jurisdiction of the Massachusetts Department of Correction.

See also
 List of Massachusetts state correctional facilities

References

Buildings and structures in Lancaster, Massachusetts
Lancaster